Natalie Massey (born 23 February 1989) is a former British Paralympic swimmer who competed in international level events. Both of her parents were training coaches, Mick Massey has coached the national swimming team of Great Britain and her mother Sheila Massey is a former swimmer who trained alongside Sharron Davies. Massey has won three international medals and has competed at the 2012 Summer Paralympics and INAS World Swimming Championships.

References

1989 births
Living people
Sportspeople from Manchester
Paralympic swimmers of Great Britain
Swimmers at the 2012 Summer Paralympics
Medalists at the World Para Swimming European Championships
Medalists at the World Para Swimming Championships
British female freestyle swimmers
British female backstroke swimmers
British female medley swimmers
S14-classified Paralympic swimmers
21st-century British women